Dave Holland (born 1946) is a British jazz bassist and composer.

Dave Holland or David Holland may also refer to:
 Dave Holland (drummer) (1948–2018), British rock drummer
 Dave Holland (Klansman), American white supremacist
 Dave Holland (rugby) (1887–1945), rugby union and rugby league footballer of the 1910s, and 1920s
 David Holland (judge), Irish judge
 David F. Holland (born 1973), American historian
 David Holland (Medal of Honor), Medal of Honor recipient for his duties in the American Indian Wars